Vallemaio is a comune (municipality) in the Province of Frosinone in the Italian region Lazio, located about  southeast of Rome and about  southeast of Frosinone.

Vallemaio borders the following municipalities: Castelforte, Castelnuovo Parano, Coreno Ausonio, San Giorgio a Liri, Sant'Andrea del Garigliano, Sant'Apollinare.

Etymology 
Before 1932, the name of the commune was Vallefredda, a toponym which emphasized the harsh climate that one has in winter. However, considering it lies on the slopes of the Mount Maio, it was renamed in 1932.

References

Cities and towns in Lazio